Loggins and Messina is the second album by singer-songwriters Loggins and Messina, released in 1972.

Following on the success of their first album, this album built on the strengths of their debut outing. It also became the true introduction of the team, Loggins and Messina, not as singles playing together, but rather as a team that played as one.

It featured two songs that charted, with "Your Mama Don't Dance" reaching its peak at number 4, their highest-charting single. The album itself charted at number 16. The album version of "Thinking of You" is a different recording than the hit single. Kenny Loggins played harmonica on four songs: "Whiskey", "Long Tail Cat", "Thinking of You" and the Jim Messina-penned instrumental "Just Before the News".

Track listing

Side one
"Good Friend" (Jim Messina) – 4:04 (lead singer: Jim Messina)
"Whiskey" (Kenny Loggins) – 1:58 (lead singer: Kenny Loggins)
"Your Mama Don't Dance" (Loggins, Messina) – 2:48 (lead singers: Jim Messina, Kenny Loggins)
"Long Tail Cat" (Loggins) – 3:47 (lead singer: Kenny Loggins)
"Golden Ribbons" (Messina) – 6:08 (lead singers: Jim Messina, Kenny Loggins, Larry Sims)

Side two
"Thinking of You" (Messina) – 2:19 (lead singer: Jim Messina)
"Just Before the News" (Messina) – 1:09 (instrumental)
"Till the Ends Meet" (Loggins) – 3:10 (lead singer: Kenny Loggins)
"Holiday Hotel" (Messina, Al Garth) – 2:02 (lead singer: Jim Messina)
"Lady of My Heart" (Loggins) – 1:44 (lead singer: Kenny Loggins)
"Angry Eyes" (Loggins, Messina) – 7:40 (lead singers: Kenny Loggins, Jim Messina)

Personnel
 Kenny Loggins – vocals, rhythm guitar, harmonica, acoustic guitar
 Jim Messina –  vocals, lead guitar, electric mandolin, acoustic guitar

Loggins & Messina band
 Merel Bregante – backing vocals, drums
 Lester "Al" Garth – violin, recorder, alto and tenor saxophones
 Jon Clarke – flute, oboe, recorder, baritone saxophone, soprano saxophone, tenor saxophone
 Larry Sims – backing vocals, bass

Sidemen
 Michael Omartian – Hammond organ, acoustic piano, harmonium, clavinet, tack piano, Wurlitzer electric piano
 Rusty Young –  dobro on "Long Tail Cat"
 Milt Holland – percussion

Production
 Producer – Jim Messina
 Engineer – George Beauregard
 Mixing – John Fiore
 Recording Consultant – Alex Kazanegras
 Design – Ron Coro and Anne Garner
 Front Cover Photo – Jim Marshall
 Back Cover Photo – Marsha Reed
 Management – Schiffman and Larsen

Charts
Album – Billboard (United States)

Singles - Billboard (United States)

References

Loggins and Messina albums
1972 albums
Albums produced by Kenny Loggins
Albums produced by Jim Messina (musician)
Columbia Records albums